Manprit Sarkaria (born 26 August 1996) is an Austrian professional footballer who plays for Sturm Graz as a left winger.

Personal life
Born in Austria, Sarkaria is a Jatt Sikh of Indian Punjabi descent.His family are from Amritsar in Punjab, India.

Career statistics

Club

Honours

Individual
 Austrian Bundesliga Team of the Year: 2021–22

References

1996 births
Living people
Austrian footballers
Austrian people of Indian descent
Association football midfielders
FK Austria Wien players
SK Sturm Graz players
Austrian Football Bundesliga players